The Tucson Arizona Temple is a temple of the Church of Jesus Christ of Latter-day Saints (LDS Church) in Catalina Foothills, Arizona, just north of Tucson. The intent to construct the temple was announced by church president Thomas S. Monson on October 6, 2012, during the church's semi-annual general conference.

Dieter F. Uchtdorf presided at a groundbreaking to signify beginning of construction on October 17, 2015. A public open house was held from June 3 to 24, 2017, excluding Sundays. The temple was dedicated on August 13, 2017, by Uchtdorf.

The Tucson Arizona Temple was designed in the art deco style, with Sonoran Desert motifs.  The temple features a dome inspired by the 1920s-era Pima County Courthouse, and is notably smaller in height than many other temples due to local zoning ordinances.

In 2020, like all the church's other temples, the Tucson Arizona Temple was closed due to the COVID-19 pandemic.

See also

 Comparison of temples of The Church of Jesus Christ of Latter-day Saints
 List of temples of The Church of Jesus Christ of Latter-day Saints
 List of temples of The Church of Jesus Christ of Latter-day Saints by geographic region
 Temple architecture (Latter-day Saints)
 The Church of Jesus Christ of Latter-day Saints in Arizona

References

External links
 Tucson Arizona Temple Official site
 Tucson Arizona Temple at ChurchofJesusChristTemples.org

2017 in Christianity
21st-century Latter Day Saint temples
Religious buildings and structures in Tucson, Arizona
Temples (LDS Church) in Arizona
2017 establishments in Arizona
Religious buildings and structures completed in 2017